Love You You is a 2011 Chinese romantic comedy film directed and written by Jingle Ma, starring Eddie Peng, Angelababy, Zhu Yuchen, and Zhou Yang. The film premiered in China on 30 September 2011.

Cast

Main Cast
 Eddie Peng as You Lele
 Angelababy as Xia Mi
 Zhu Yuchen as Hao Chang
 Zhou Yang as Sophia

Other
 Alvin Wong as Wuguji.
 Ye Liangcai as JK.
 He Jie as Xia Mi's colleague.

Music
 JJ Lin - Love You You.
 JJ Lin and Angelababy - The Heart of the Sea.

Production
The movie was filmed in Lang Tengah Island, Terengganu, Malaysia.

Release
The film was released in China on September 30, 2011.

Box office
The film grossed ￥5.2 million.

Award

References

External links
 
 

2010s Mandarin-language films
Chinese romantic comedy films
DMG Entertainment films
2011 romantic comedy films